St Andrew Parish, Cumberland is one of the 57 parishes of Cumberland County, New South Wales, a cadastral unit for use on land titles. It is one of the four small parishes in the Sydney city area (together with St Philip, St Lawrence and St James), and is named after the church of St Andrew's. The parish was named while the church was still in the planning stages. The parish includes Pyrmont and the Darling Harbour area. It is bounded by Wattle Street in the south west, George Street in the south and east, and King Street in the north-east. It includes Town Hall railway station, which is on the eastern end of the parish.

Locations 
Images of locations in the parish:

References
 
 Saint Andrew's cathedral site act 1935

Parishes of Cumberland County